Frank Simonetti (born September 11, 1962 in Stoneham, Massachusetts) is an American retired professional ice hockey defenseman who played 115 games in the National Hockey League (NHL) for the Boston Bruins between 1984 and 1988. Prior to turning professional Simonetti spent two years at Norwich University.

Playing career
As a youth, Simonetti played in the 1975 Quebec International Pee-Wee Hockey Tournament with the Boston Braves minor ice hockey team. He went on to play two seasons with Norwich University, an on October 4, 1984 was signed as a free agent by the Boston Bruins of the National Hockey League. He played 115 games for the Bruins over four seasons from 1984 to 1988, also spending time with the Bruins' American Hockey League affiliates the Hershey Bears, Moncton Golden Flames, and Maine Mariners.

Career statistics

Regular season and playoffs

References

Bibliography

External links
 

1962 births
Living people
American men's ice hockey defensemen
Boston Bruins players
Hershey Bears players
Ice hockey players from Massachusetts
Maine Mariners players
Moncton Golden Flames players
Norwich Cadets men's ice hockey players
People from Stoneham, Massachusetts
Sportspeople from Middlesex County, Massachusetts
Undrafted National Hockey League players